Randy Ewers (born 1968) is an American politician. He was the Mayor of Ocala, Florida, elected in December 2005. He served four terms as Mayor before standing down in 2011. By trade Ewers is an industrial engineer, and he is certified as Class 1 status.

Education
Ewers is a graduate of the University of Florida, and his major was in Industrial Engineering.

References

External links
Mayor Ewers Official Profile
Ewers election
Info on Ewers

Living people
Mayors of places in Florida
University of Florida alumni
1968 births
Politicians from Ocala, Florida